Emilio García (born 24 November 1938) is a Spanish rower. He competed in the men's coxed four event at the 1960 Summer Olympics.

References

1938 births
Living people
Spanish male rowers
Olympic rowers of Spain
Rowers at the 1960 Summer Olympics
Sportspeople from Vigo